Lisa Dergan (born August 10, 1970) is an American model, actress, media personality, and sportscaster. She was Playboy's Playmate of the Month for July 1998.

Dergan has established a career beyond Playboy, in particular in the world of sportscasting. Her big break came in 2001, when she was hired to work a weekend sports show alongside Jim Hill at KCBS in Los Angeles. She joined Fox Sports Net in 2002. She has interviewed subjects such as Tiger Woods, John Elway, and Chuck Liddell, and has reported from such events as the Super Bowl, the Kentucky Derby, and the U.S. Open golf tournament.

She served as the co-host with Ken Ober on the USA Network game show Smush. In 2003, she hosted the reality wedding competition Race to the Altar, which featured wedding and lifestyle guru Colin Cowie.

She co-starred in the film The Arena with fellow Playmate Karen McDougal in 2001.

She was the St. Pauli Girl spokesmodel in 2003.
 
By appearing in the 1999 James Bond short story "Midsummer Night's Doom" by Raymond Benson (in which 007 visits the Playboy Mansion), Dergan has the distinction of being the first real person (rather than an actress playing a non-fictional character) ever to be awarded the status of Bond girl, as she has a relationship with Bond in the story.

Personal life
In 2008, Dergan married baseball player Scott Podsednik. They divorced in the spring of 2017. She had previously dated film director Michael Bay.

References

External links

20th-century American actresses
1990s Playboy Playmates
People from Corpus Christi, Texas
San Diego State University alumni
1970 births
Living people
Women sports announcers
Golf writers and broadcasters
American horse racing announcers
American sports announcers
National Football League announcers
21st-century American women